Stade Municipal is a multi-use stadium in Foumban, Cameroon. It is currently used mostly for football matches. It serves as a home ground of Fédéral Noun. The stadium holds 5,000 people. Funds were allocated for the rehabilitation of the stadium in preparation for the Africa Cup of Nations in 2020.

References 

Football venues in Cameroon